South New Berlin is a hamlet in Chenango County, New York, United States. South New Berlin has a post office with ZIP code 13843, which opened on July 20, 1822.

References

Hamlets in Chenango County, New York
Hamlets in New York (state)